Bishkek), formerly Pishpek and Frunze, is the capital and largest city of Kyrgyzstan. Bishkek is also the administrative centre of the Chüy Region. The region surrounds the city, although the city itself is not part of the region but rather a region-level unit of Kyrgyzstan. Bishkek is situated near the Kazakhstan–Kyrgyzstan border. Its population was 1,074,075 in 2021.

In 1825, the Khanate of Kokand established the fortress of Pishpek to control local caravan routes and to collect tribute from Kyrgyz tribes. On 4 September 1860, with the approval of the Kyrgyz, Russian forces led by Colonel Apollon Zimmermann destroyed the fortress. In the present day, the fortress ruins can be found just north of Jibek jolu street, near the new main mosque. In 1868, a Russian settlement was established on the site of the fortress under its original name, Pishpek. It lay within the General Governorship of Russian Turkestan and its Semirechye Oblast.

In 1925, the Kara-Kirghiz Autonomous Oblast was established in Russian Turkestan, promoting Pishpek to its capital. In 1926, the Communist Party of the Soviet Union renamed the city Frunze, after Bolshevik military leader Mikhail Frunze (1885–1925), who was born there. In 1936, Frunze became the capital of the Kirghiz Soviet Socialist Republic, during the final stages of national delimitation in the Soviet Union. In 1991, the Kyrgyz parliament changed the capital's name to Bishkek.

North of the city, a fertile and gently undulating steppe extends far north into neighbouring Kazakhstan. The river Chüy drains most of the area. Bishkek is connected to the Turkestan–Siberia Railway by a spur line.

Bishkek is a city of wide boulevards and marble-faced public buildings combined with numerous Soviet-style apartment blocks surrounding interior courtyards. There are also thousands of smaller, privately built houses, mostly outside the city centre. Streets follow a grid pattern, with most flanked on both sides by narrow irrigation channels, which provide water to trees which provide shade during the hot summers.

Etymology 
Bishkek is supposedly named after the paddle used to churn the fermenting milk.

The official website of the Bishkek's city hall provides the following etymological justification for the name of the city: the pregnant wife of a heo) lost a paddle used to churn kumis. While looking for it, she suddenly gave birth to a boy, who she named Bishkek. Bishkek would grow up to be a noble figure and after his death, was buried on a mound near the banks of the Alamüdün. There, a tombstone was erected. The building was seen and described by travelers of the 17th and 18th centuries.

History

Based on DNA evidence, the area near Bishkek is considered one of the possible origins of the Black Death between AD 1346 and 1353.

Kokhand rule
Originally a caravan rest stop, possibly founded by the Sogdians, on one of the branches of the Silk Road through the Tian Shan range, the location was fortified in 1825 by the khan of Kokand with a mud fort. In the last years of Kokhand rule, the Pishpek fortress was led by Atabek, the Datka.

Tsarist era
In 1860, Imperial Russia annexed the area, and the military forces of Colonel  took and razed the fort. Colonel Zimmermann rebuilt the town over the destroyed fort and appointed field-Poruchik Titov as head of a new Russian garrison. The Imperial Russian government redeveloped the site from 1877 onward, encouraging the settlement of Russian peasants by giving them fertile land to develop.

Soviet era

In 1926, the city became the capital of the newly established Kirghiz ASSR and was renamed Frunze after Mikhail Frunze, Lenin's close associate who was born in Bishkek and played key roles during the revolutions of 1905 and 1917 and during the Russian Civil War of the early 1920s.

Independence era
The early 1990s were a tumultuous time for Bishkek. In June 1990, a state of emergency was declared following severe ethnic riots in southern Kyrgyzstan that threatened to spread to the capital. The city was renamed Bishkek on 5 February 1991, and Kyrgyzstan achieved independence later that year during the breakup of the Soviet Union. Before independence, the majority of Bishkek's population were ethnic Russians.

Bishkek is Kyrgyzstan's financial centre, with all of the country's 21 commercial banks headquartered there. During the Soviet era, the city was home to many industrial plants, but most have been shut down since 1991 or now operate on a much-reduced scale. One of Bishkek's largest employment centres today is the Dordoy Bazaar open market, where many of the Chinese goods imported to CIS countries are sold.

Geography

Orientation
Although Bishkek itself is relatively young, its surrounding area has some sites of interest dating to prehistoric times. There are also sites from the Greco-Buddhist period, the period of Nestorian influence, the era of the Central Asian khanates, and the Soviet period.

The central part of the city is laid out on a rectangular grid plan. The city's main street is the east-west Chüy Avenue (Chüy Prospekti), named after the region's main river. In the Soviet era, it was called Lenin Avenue. Along or near it are many important government buildings and universities. These include the Academy of Sciences compound. The westernmost section of the avenue is known as Deng Xiaoping Avenue.

The main north–south street is Yusup Abdrakhmanov Street, still commonly referred to by its old name, Sovietskaya Street. Its northern and southern sections are called, respectively, Yelebesov and Baityk Batyr Streets. Several major shopping centres are located along with it, and in the north, it provides access to Dordoy Bazaar.

Erkindik ("Freedom") Boulevard runs from north to south, from the main railroad station (Bishkek II) south of Chüy Avenue to the museum quarter and sculpture park just north of Chüy Avenue, and further north toward the Ministry of Foreign Affairs. In the past, it was called Dzerzhinsky Boulevard, named after a Communist revolutionary, Felix Dzerzhinsky, and its northern continuation is still called Dzerzhinsky Street.

An important east–west street is Jibek Jolu ('Silk Road'). Both the eastern and western bus terminals are located along Jibek Jolu.

There is a Roman Catholic church located at ul. Vasiljeva 197 (near Rynok Bayat). It is the only Catholic cathedral in Kyrgyzstan.

A stadium named in honour of Dolon Omurzakov is located near the centre of Bishkek. This is the largest stadium in the Kyrgyz Republic.

City centre
 Kyrgyz State Historical Museum, located in Ala-Too Square, the main city square.
 State Museum of Applied Arts, containing examples of traditional Kyrgyz handicrafts.
 Frunze House Museum.
 Statue of Ivan Panfilov in the park near the White House.
 An equestrian statue of Mikhail Frunze stands in a large park (Boulevard Erkindik) across from the train station.
 The train station was built in 1946 by German prisoners of war and has survived since then without further renovation or repairs; most of those who built it perished and were buried in unmarked pits near the station. 
 The main government building, the White House, is a large seven-story marble building and the former headquarters of the Communist Party of the Kirghiz SSR.
 At Ala-Too Square there is an independence monument where the changing of the guards may be watched.
Osh Bazaar, west of the city centre, is a large, picturesque produce market.
Kyrgyz National Philharmonic, concert hall.

Outer neighbourhoods
The Dordoy Bazaar, just inside the bypass highway on the north-eastern edge of the city, is a major retail and wholesale market.

Outside the city

Distances
Bishkek is about 300 km away directly from the country's second largest city Osh. However, its nearest large city is Almaty of Kazakhstan, which is 190 km to the east. Furthermore, it is 470 km from Tashkent (Uzbekistan), 680 km from Dushanbe (Tajikistan), and about 1,000 km each from Astana (Kazakhstan), Ürümqi (China), Islamabad (Pakistan), and Kabul (Afghanistan).

Climate
Bishkek has a Mediterranean-influenced humid continental climate (Köppen climate classification Dsa), as the average mean temperature in the winter is below . The summer months are dominated by dry periods, punctuated by the occasional thunderstorm, which produces strong gusty winds and rare dust storms. The mountains to the south provide a natural boundary and protection from damaging weather, as does the smaller mountain chain that runs north-west to south-east. In the winter months, sparse snow storms and frequent heavy fog are the dominating features. There are sometimes temperature inversions, during which the fog can last for days at a time.

Demographics
Bishkek is the most populated city in Kyrgyzstan. Its population, estimated in 2021, was 1,074,075. From the foundation of the city to the mid-1990s, ethnic Russians and other peoples of European descent (Ukrainians, Germans) comprised the majority of the city's population. According to the 1970 census, the ethnic Kyrgyz were only 12.3%, while Europeans comprised more than 80% of the Frunze population. Now Bishkek is a predominantly Kyrgyz city, with 75% of its residents Kyrgyz, while European peoples make up around 15% of the population. Despite this fact, Russian is the main language while Kyrgyz continues losing ground, especially among the younger generations.

Ecology and environment

Air quality
Emissions of air pollutants in Bishkek amounted to 14,400 tons in 2010. Among all cities in Kyrgyzstan, the level of air pollution in Bishkek is the highest, occasionally exceeding maximum allowable concentrations by several times, especially in the city centre. For example, concentrations of formaldehyde occasionally exceed maximum allowable limits by a factor of four.

Responsibility for ambient air quality monitoring in Bishkek lies with the Kyrgyz State Agency of Hydrometeorology. There are seven air-quality monitoring stations in Bishkek, measuring levels of sulfur dioxide, nitrogen oxides, formaldehyde, and ammonia.

Economy

Bishkek uses the Kyrgyzstan currency, the som. The som's value fluctuates regularly but averaged around 85 som per U.S. dollar as of March 2023. The economy in Bishkek is primarily agricultural, and agricultural products are sometimes bartered in the outlying regions. The streets of Bishkek are regularly lined with produce vendors in a market-style venue. In most of the downtown area there is a more urban cityscape with banks, stores, markets, and malls. Sought-after goods include hand-crafted artisan pieces, such as statues, carvings, paintings, and many nature-based sculptures.

Housing 
As with many cities in post-Soviet states, housing in Bishkek has undergone extensive changes since the collapse of the Soviet Union. While housing was formerly distributed to citizens in the Soviet era, housing in Bishkek has since become privatised.

Though single-family houses are slowly becoming more popular, the majority of the residents live in Soviet-era apartments. Despite the Kyrgyz economy experiencing growth, increases in available housing have been slow with very little new construction. As a result of this growing prosperity and the lack of new formal housing, prices have been rising significantly—doubling from 2001 to 2002.

Those unable to afford the high housing price within Bishkek, notably internal migrants from rural villages and small provincial towns, often have to resort to informal squatter settlements on the city's outskirts. These settlements are estimated to house 400,000 people or about 30 percent of Bishkek's population. While many of the settlements have lacked basic necessities such as electricity and running water, recently, the local government has pushed to provide these services.

Government
Local government is administered by the Bishkek Mayor's Office. Askarbek Salymbekov was mayor until his resignation in August 2005, after which his deputy, Arstanbek Nogoev, took over the mayorship. Nogoev was in turn removed from his position in October 2007 through a decree of President Kurmanbek Bakiyev and replaced by businessman and former first deputy prime minister Daniar Usenov. In July 2008 former head of the Kyrgyz Railways Nariman Tuleyev was appointed mayor, who was dismissed by the interim government after 7 April 2010. From April 2010 to February 2011 Isa Omurkulov, also a former head of the Kyrgyz Railways, was an interim mayor, and from 4 February 2011 to 14 December 2013 he was re-elected the mayor of Bishkek. Kubanychbek Kulmatov was nominated for election by parliamentary group of Social Democratic Party of Kyrgyzstan in city kenesh, and he was elected as a new mayor on 15 January 2014, and stepped down on 9 February 2016.
The next mayor, Albek Sabirbekovich Ibraimov, was also nominated for election by parliamentary group of Social Democratic Party of Kyrgyzstan in city kenesh, and Bishkek City Kenesh elected him on 27 February 2016. The current mayor is Emil Abdykadyrov, who was elected on 24 February 2022.

Administrative divisions
Besides the city proper, one urban-type settlement and one village are administered by the city: Chong-Aryk and Orto-Say. The city is divided into 4 districts: Birinchi May, Lenin, Oktyabr and Sverdlov. Chong-Aryk and Orto-Say are part of Lenin District. Since the collapse of the Soviet Union, there has been discussion of replacing the Soviet era district names with ones that reflect Kyrgyz identity and history. Other former Soviet republics have widely replaced Soviet era place names; despite renaming the capital in 1991, Kyrgyzstan is the only nation in Central Asia to retain Soviet era names for districts in its capital.

Sports
Bishkek is home to Spartak, the largest football stadium in Kyrgyzstan and the only one eligible to host international matches. Several Bishkek-based football teams play on this pitch, including six-time Kyrgyzstan League champions, Dordoi Bishkek. Others include Alga Bishkek, Ilbirs Bishkek, and RUOR-Guardia Bishkek.

Bishkek hosted the 2014 IIHF Challenge Cup of Asia – Division I.

Education
Educational institutions in Bishkek include:
 APAP KR
 American University of Central Asia
 Arabaev Kyrgyz State University
 Bishkek Humanities University
 International Atatürk-Alatoo University
 International University of Kyrgyzstan
 Kyrgyz-Russian Slavic University
 I.K. Akhunbaev Kyrgyz State Medical Academy
 Kyrgyz State National University
 Kyrgyz Technical University
 Kyrgyz-Russian State University
 Kyrgyz-Turkish MANAS University
 Kyrgyz Uzbek University
 Plato University of Management and Design
 University of Central Asia
In addition, the following international schools serve the expatriate community in Bishkek:
 European School in Central Asia
 Oxford International School Bishkek
 Hope Academy of Bishkek
 QSI International School of Bishkek
 Silk Road International School

Transportation

Mass public transport
Public transportation includes buses, electric trolleybuses, and public vans (known in Russian as marshrutka). The first bus and trolley bus services in Bishkek were introduced in 1934 and 1951, respectively.

Taxi cabs can be found throughout the city.

The city is considering designing and building a light rail system.

Commuter and long-distance buses
There are two main bus stations in Bishkek. The smaller old Eastern Bus Station is primarily the terminal for minibusses to various destinations within or just beyond the eastern suburbs, such as Kant, Tokmok, Kemin, Issyk Ata, or the Korday border crossing.

Long-distance regular bus and minibus services to all parts of the country, as well as to Almaty (the largest city in neighbouring Kazakhstan) and Kashgar, China, run mostly from the newer grand Western Bus Station; only a smaller number run from the Eastern Station.

The Dordoy Bazaar on the north-eastern outskirts of the city also contains makeshift terminals for frequent minibusses to suburban towns in all directions (from Sokuluk in the west to Tokmak in the east) and to some buses taking traders to Kazakhstan and Siberia.

Rail
, the Bishkek-2 railway station sees only a few trains a day. It offers a popular three-day train service from Bishkek to Moscow.

There are also long-distance trains that leave for Siberia (Novosibirsk and Novokuznetsk), via Almaty, over the TurkSib route, and to Yekaterinburg (Sverdlovsk) in the Urals, via Astana. These services are remarkably slow (over 48 hours to Yekaterinburg), due to long stops at the border and the indirect route (the trains first have to go west for more than a  before they enter the main TurkSib line and can continue to the east or north).

Air

In 2002, the United States obtained the right to use Manas International Airport as an air base for its military operations in Afghanistan and Iraq. It is based at a facility that used to be home to a major Soviet military pilot training school; one of its students, Hosni Mubarak, later became president of Egypt.

Notable people
 Talant Dujshebaev (born 1968), handball coach and former handball player (voted 2nd IHF World Player of the Century)
 Mikhail Frunze (1885–1925), after whom the city was named from 1926 to 1991
 Nasirdin Isanov (1943–1991), first prime minister of Kyrgyzstan
 Denis Ivanov (born 1983), former Russian professional football player
 Sergei B. Korolev (born 1962), First Deputy Director of the Federal Security Service
 Alexander Mashkevitch (born 1954), Kazakh-Israeli billionaire businessman and investor
 Orzubek Nazarov (born 1966), former WBA lightweight boxing champion
 Roza Isakovna Otunbayeva (born 1950), third president of Kyrgyzstan
 Vladimir Perlin (born 1942), cellist
Denis Petrashov (born 2000), swimmer, Youth Games and Maccabiah Games medalist
 Salizhan Sharipov (born 1964), first cosmonaut of the independent Kyrgyz Republic
 Antonina Shevchenko (born 1984), kickboxer
 Valentina Shevchenko (born 1988), kickboxer and UFC champion
 Tugelbay Sydykbekov (1912–1997), writer
 Natalya Tsyganova (born 1971), 800m medallist at the World and European championships, representing Russia

Twin towns – sister cities

Bishkek is twinned with:

 Almaty, Kazakhstan (1994)
 Ankara, Turkey (1992)
 Ashgabat, Turkmenistan (2018)
 Colorado Springs, United States (1994)
 Doha, Qatar (2014)
 Gumi, South Korea (1991)
 İzmir, Turkey (1994)
 Kyiv, Ukraine (1997)
 Lianyungang, China (2015)
 Astana, Kazakhstan (2011)
 Qazvin, Iran (2003)
 Samsun, Turkey
 Shenzhen, China (2016)
 Tashkent, Uzbekistan
 Tehran, Iran (1994)
 Trabzon, Turkey (2014)
 Ufa, Russia (2017)
 Ürümqi, China (1993)
 Wuhan, China (2016)
 Yinchuan, China (2000)

See also 

 List of monuments of Bishkek
 Outline of Kyrgyzstan

References

Bibliography

External links 

 The Spektator – society, culture, and travel articles on Kyrgyzstan and Bishkek city guide (archived)

 
1825 establishments in Asia
Capitals in Asia
Cities in Central Asia
Populated places along the Silk Road
Populated places established in 1825
Populated places in Kyrgyzstan
Regions of Kyrgyzstan
Semirechye Oblast